XHTXP-FM is a radio station on 89.9 FM in San Juan Bautista Tuxtepec, Oaxaca. XHTXP is owned by Asociación de Medios de Comunicación Comunitaria, A.C. and is known as Radio Cuenca.

History
AMCC applied for the permit for Radio Cuenca in 2007. It was not awarded until December 14, 2016, and it took the station another year to come to air, signing on in February 2018. The concessionaire is owned by a group of civil associations and institutions, including the Instituto Tecnológico de Tuxtepec.

References

Radio stations in Oaxaca
Community radio stations in Mexico
2018 establishments in Mexico
Radio stations established in 2018